Duncan Graham may refer to:

 Duncan Archibald Graham (1882–1974), Canadian physician and academic
 Duncan Graham (writer) (born 1938), Australian journalist and blogger
 Duncan Graham (Canadian politician) (1845–1934), Canadian Member of Parliament for Ontario North, 1897–1900
 Duncan Graham Ross (1891-1982), Canadian Member of Parliament for Middlesex East, 1935–1945
 Duncan Macgregor Graham (1867–1942), British Member of Parliament for Hamilton, 1918–1942
 Duncan Graham, South Australian playwright and winner of the Jill Blewett Playwright's Award in 2008 and 2016